Entheus eumelus is a species of butterfly of the family Hesperiidae. It is found from Central America to Suriname.

References

Butterflies described in 1777
Eudaminae